Ysie White (born 17 August 1993) is a Welsh international lawn bowler.

Bowls career
In 2019 she won the fours gold medal and the pairs bronze medal at the Atlantic Bowls Championships

In 2020, she was selected for the 2020 World Outdoor Bowls Championship in Australia.

In 2022, she competed in the women's triples and the Women's fours at the 2022 Commonwealth Games.

References

Welsh female bowls players
1993 births
Living people
Bowls players at the 2022 Commonwealth Games